Ramganj is an upazila of Lakshmipur District in the Division of Chittagong, Bangladesh.

History
This area was home to an influential Hindu religious leader by the name of Ram after who Ramganj was named after. The Nagmud Madrasa was founded in Ramganj in 1856. In 1891, a thana (police outpost) was established in Ramganj. The Noakhali riots spread to Ramganj on 10 October 1946, and led to heavy casualties for several days. In response, Mahatma Gandhi arrived from Delhi as an appeal.

During the Bangladesh Liberation War of 1971, the Pakistan Army and their collaborators set up camps in Ramganj Godown, Dakbungalow and Ramganj MU High School, and plundered villages in Ramganj. Some of these soldiers were murdered whilst battling against Bengali freedom fighters in Dighir Par, Fatehpur. The army later kidnapped 14 freedom fighters, butchering them in their camp at Ramganj. Mass killings were also conducted near the Madrasa of Hajirhat Kalakopa. On 24 March 1983, Ramganj Thana was upgraded to an upazila as part of the President of Bangladesh Hussain Muhammad Ershad's decentralisation project.

Geography

Demographics
According to the 2011 Bangladesh census, Ramganj had a population of 342027. Males constituted 47.98% of the population, and females 52.02%. Of the total population, only 171270 people are over the age of 18, meaning that more than 52.6% of the population is younger than 18.

Administration
Ramganj Upazila is divided into Ramganj Municipality and ten union parishads: Bhadur, Bhatra, Bholakot, Chandipur, Darbeshpur, Icchapur, Kanchanpur, Karpara, Lamchar, and Noagaon. The union parishads are subdivided into 122 mauzas and 134 villages.

Ramganj Municipality is subdivided into 9 wards and 18 mahallas.

Education and facilities
Ramganj has an average literacy rate of 57.3%, 12.6 percentage points above the national average of 32.4%. It is home to 37 madrasas namely Nagmud Madrasa, Hajirhat Kalakopa Madrasa and Kethuri Senior Madrasa. There are 432 mosques in Ramganj and some include the Great Mosque of Sonapur, the Registry Office Mosque, Dakbungalow Mosque, the Great Mosque of Fatehpur and the Dayra Sharif Mosque in Shyampur.

Economy and tourism
Ramganj is home to several historic dargahs in Kachua, Kanchanpur (Shah Miran) and Harris Char. It is home to natural gas and mainly exports iron stationery, shital Pati, oranges, betel nuts and coconuts.

Notable people
 ATM Shamsuzzaman, film and television actor, director and screen-playwright
 Gholam Sarwar Husseini, politician and former Pir of Dayra
 Nazim Uddin Ahmed, former MP for Lakshmipur-1 
 S I M Nurunnabi Khan, freedom fighter
 Ziaul Haque Zia, former MP for Lakshmipur-1
 Mahfuz Ahmed, television actor
 Nishat Majumdar, 1st women Everest winner in Bangladesh

See also
Asharkota

References

Ramganj Upazila